Samuel Sydney Silverman (8 October 1895 – 9 February 1968) was a British Labour politician and vocal opponent of capital punishment.

Early life
Silverman was born in poverty to a migrant Jewish parents from Jassy, Romania. His father was a draper living in the Kensington Fields area of Liverpool.

Silverman attended Liverpool Institute and the University of Liverpool, thanks to scholarships. During the First World War he was a conscientious objector to military service and served three prison sentences, in Preston, Wormwood Scrubs and Belfast prisons.

Career
Silverman was a lecturer in English at the National University of Finland from 1921 to 1925, and then returned to the University of Liverpool to teach and read law. After qualifying as a solicitor, he worked on workmen's compensation claims and landlord-tenant disputes.

From 1932 to 1938, Silverman served on Liverpool City Council. He contested Liverpool Exchange without success at a by-election in 1933, but was elected as Member of Parliament (MP) for Nelson and Colne in the general election in 1935.

Silverman was prominent in his support for Jews worldwide and for their rights in Palestine. He rethought his pacifism in light of the reports of antisemitism in Europe, and reluctantly supported Britain's entry into the Second World War. He was vocal in asking from the government (and Churchill in particular) for a statement of war aims, which had become a contentious issue in the early years of the war. Silverman was prominent within the debates over the potential repatriation of Jewish refugees, telling Churchill "that it would be difficult to conceive of a more cruel procedure than to take people who have lost everything they have – their homes, their relatives, their children, all the things that make life decent and possible – and compel them against their will, to go back to the scene of those crimes".

Silverman was widely expected to join the government after the Labour victory in the general election in 1945, but, as he was a leftist, he was not appointed by Clement Attlee. He became opposed to the government's foreign policy. He refused to support German rearmament in 1954 and had the Labour Party Whip withdrawn from November 1954 to April 1955. He was one of the founders of the Campaign for Nuclear Disarmament. In 1961, as a protest against bipartisan support for British nuclear weapons, he voted against the Royal Air Force, Royal Navy and British Army estimates in the House of Commons, and was suspended from the Labour Party Whip from March 1961 until May 1963.

Silverman died on 9 February 1968 following a stroke.

Opponent of capital punishment
A fervent opponent of the death penalty, Silverman founded the National Campaign for the Abolition of Capital Punishment. In 1948 an amendment debated in house of commons proposing abolition of capital punishment passed but it was defeated by the house of lords. He wrote about several miscarriages of justice in the 1940s and 1950s, such as the hanging of Timothy Evans when it later emerged that serial killer John Christie had murdered Evans's wife and had given perjured evidence at Evans's trial in 1949. Silverman proposed a private member's bill on abolition of the death penalty, which was passed by 200 votes to 98 on a free vote in the House of Commons on 28 June 1956; but was defeated in the House of Lords.

In 1965, he successfully piloted the Murder (Abolition of Death Penalty) Bill through Parliament, abolishing capital punishment for murder in the UK and in the British Armed Forces for a period of five years but with provision for abolition to be made permanent by affirmative resolutions of both Houses of Parliament before the end of that period. The appropriate resolutions were passed in 1969. Silverman was opposed at the 1966 general election in the Nelson and Colne constituency by Patrick Downey, the uncle of Lesley Anne Downey, a victim in the Moors murders case, who stood on an explicitly pro-hanging platform. Downey polled over 5,000 votes, 13.7%, then the largest vote for a genuinely independent candidate since 1945.

Notes

References 

Emrys Hughes: Sydney Silverman, Rebel in Parliament, 1969

External links 

 
 
Sidney Silverman & the Death Penalty - UK Parliament Living Heritage

1895 births
1968 deaths
Alumni of the University of Liverpool
British anti–death penalty activists
Academic staff of the University of Helsinki
English people of Romanian-Jewish descent
Councillors in Liverpool
English Jews
Jewish British politicians
Jewish pacifists
Jewish socialists
Labour Party (UK) MPs for English constituencies
Lawyers from Liverpool
People educated at Liverpool Institute High School for Boys
UK MPs 1935–1945
UK MPs 1945–1950
UK MPs 1950–1951
UK MPs 1951–1955
UK MPs 1955–1959
UK MPs 1959–1964
UK MPs 1964–1966
UK MPs 1966–1970
English solicitors
Academics of the University of Liverpool